Julius Eastman (October 27, 1940 – May 28, 1990) was an American composer, pianist, vocalist, and performance artist whose work is associated with musical minimalism. He was among the first composers to combine minimalist processes with elements of pop music, and involve experimental methods of extending and modifying music in creating what he called "organic music". He often gave his pieces titles with provocative political intent, such as Evil Nigger and Gay Guerrilla, and has been acclaimed following new performances and reissues of his music.

Biography
Julius Eastman grew up in Ithaca, New York, with his mother, Frances Eastman, and younger brother, Gerry. He began studying piano at age 14 and made rapid progress. He studied at Ithaca College before transferring to the Curtis Institute of Music in Philadelphia. There he studied piano with Mieczysław Horszowski and composition with Constant Vauclain, and switched majors from piano to composition, graduating in 1963. He made his debut as a pianist in 1966 at The Town Hall in New York City. Eastman had a rich, deep, and extremely flexible singing voice, for which he became noted for his 1973 Nonesuch recording of Eight Songs for a Mad King by the British composer Peter Maxwell Davies. Eastman's talents gained the attention of composer-conductor Lukas Foss, who conducted Davies' music in performance at the Brooklyn Philharmonic.

At the behest of Foss, Eastman joined the Creative Associates — a "prestigious program in avant-garde classical music" that "carried a stipend but no teaching obligations"—at SUNY Buffalo's Center for the Creative and Performing Arts. During this period, he met Petr Kotik, a Czech-born composer, conductor, and flutist. Eastman and Kotik performed together extensively in the early to mid-1970s. Along with Kotik, Eastman was a founding member of the S.E.M. Ensemble.

From 1971 he performed and toured with the group, and composed numerous works for it. During this period, fifteen of Eastman's earliest works were performed by the Creative Associates, including Stay On It (1973), an early augury of postminimalism and one of the first art music compositions inspired by progressions from popular music, presaging the later innovations of Arthur Russell and Rhys Chatham. Although Eastman began to teach theory and composition courses over the course of his tenure, he left Buffalo in 1975 following a controversially ribald performance of John Cage's aleatoric Songbooks by the S.E.M. Ensemble under the aegis of Morton Feldman. It included nudity and homoerotic allusions interpolated by Eastman. Cage was incensed and said during an ensuing lecture that Eastman's "[ego]... is closed in on homosexuality. And we know this because he has no other idea to express." Additionally, Eastman's friend Kyle Gann has speculated that his inability to acclimate to the more bureaucratic elements of academic life (including paperwork) may have hastened his departure from the university.

Shortly thereafter, Eastman settled in New York City, where he initially straddled the divide between the conventionally bifurcated "uptown" and downtown music scenes. Eastman often wrote his music following what he called an "organic" principle. Each new section of a work contained all the information from previous sections, though sometimes "the information is taken out at a gradual and logical rate." The principle is most evident in his three works for four pianos, Evil Nigger, Crazy Nigger, and Gay Guerrilla, all from around 1979. The last of these appropriates Martin Luther's hymn, "A Mighty Fortress Is Our God," as a gay manifesto. 
In 1976, Eastman participated in a performance of Eight Songs for a Mad King conducted by Pierre Boulez at Lincoln Center. He served as the first male vocalist in Meredith Monk's ensemble, as documented on her influential album Dolmen Music (1981). He fostered a strong kinship and collaboration with Arthur Russell, conducting nearly all of his orchestral recordings (compiled as First Thought Best Thought [Audika Records, 2006]) and participating (as organist and vocalist) in the recording of 24-24 Music (1982; released under the imprimatur of Dinosaur L), a controversial disco-influenced composition that included the underground dance hits "Go Bang!" and "In the Cornbelt"; both featured Eastman's trademark bravado.

During this period, he also played in a jazz ensemble with his brother Gerry, who previously played guitar in the Count Basie Orchestra. He played in and conducted the Brooklyn Philharmonia's CETA Orchestra (funded by the Comprehensive Employment and Training Act under the administration of the Cultural Council Foundation). He also coordinated the Philharmonia's Community Concert Series in conjunction with Foss and other composers of color. By 1980, he was regularly touring across the United States and internationally; a recording of a performance from that year at Northwestern University was released on the posthumous compilation Unjust Malaise (2005).

A 1981 piece for Eastman's cello ensemble, The Holy Presence of Joan d'Arc, was performed at The Kitchen in New York City. In 1986, the choreographer Molissa Fenley set her dance, Geologic Moments, to music of Philip Glass and two works by Eastman (an unknown work for two pianos and "One God" in which Eastman sang and played piano), which premiered at the Brooklyn Academy of Music.

Despondent about what he saw as a dearth of worthy professional opportunities, Eastman grew increasingly dependent on drugs after 1983. His life fell apart; many of his scores were impounded by the New York City Sheriff's Office following an eviction in the early 1980s, further impeding his professional development. While homeless, he briefly took refuge in Tompkins Square Park. His hope for a lectureship at Cornell University also failed to materialize during this period.

Despite a temporary attempt at a comeback, Eastman died alone at the age of 49 in Millard Fillmore Hospital in Buffalo, New York of cardiac arrest.  No public notice was given to his death until an obituary by Kyle Gann appeared in the Village Voice; it was dated January 22, 1991, eight months after Eastman died. As Eastman's notational methods were loose and open to interpretation, revival of his music has been a difficult task, dependent on people who worked with him.

Style
Eastman's works often involve repeating, slowly evolving and discordant aleatoric sections, and pop structures (particularly in Stay on It (1973) or The Holy Presence of Joan D'Arc (1981), which repeat but dramatically evolve catchy riffs). As well as this, his long-form piano pieces like Evil Nigger (1979) and Gay Guerrilla (c. 1980) show his intent to dramatically explore his Black and gay identity through motifs that, in tone and repetition, represent heightening conflict, particularly strong in emotion for minimalism. Eastman described his works as "organic music" involving "gradual accrual and accumulation, often followed by gradual disintegration", where he would gradually and sometimes abruptly alter repeated refrains and phrases to create the basis for sheet music and its performance.

Artistic legacy
The composer Mary Jane Leach found scores by Eastman, initially posting them to her website. They are now available through G. Schirmer.

In June 2006, the New York-based group Ne(x)tworks presented their score realization (by Cornelius Dufallo and Chris McIntyre) of Eastman's Stay On It at the ISSUE Project Room silo space on Carroll Street in Brooklyn.

In 2007 the California E A R Unit gave a performance of Crazy Nigger at REDCAT (The Roy and Edna Disney CalArts Theater in the Walt Disney Concert Hall Complex).

Eastman's piece Crazy Nigger was performed March 15, 2008, during 7th Edition Dag in de Branding Festival, The Hague, the Netherlands.

On February 10, 2012, Luciano Chessa curated for Sarah Cahill's
L@te Series of the Berkeley Art Museum/PFA the first Eastman
retrospective. The concert included the performance of Eastman's
Evil Nigger and Gay Guerrilla for six pianos, Eastman's last known
composition, Our Father, and the first live performance of the Prelude
to the Holy Presence of Joan d'Arc, transcribed by bass Richard Mix
under Chessa's invitation. The event also included Chessa's DJ live set
of NY house music recordings featuring Eastman and his collaborators.
The preview piece for this event in the SF Chronicle, by Joshua Kosman, is the first full writeup on Eastman ever to appear in a major
US newspaper.

On March 26, 2013, New Amsterdam Records released an album by Jace Clayton entitled The Julius Eastman Memory Depot. The album includes performances of "Evil Nigger" and "Gay Guerilla" by David Friend and Emily Manzo that have been manipulated and re-arranged by Clayton. The album's final track is a tribute to the late composer titled, "Callback from the American Society of Eastman Supporters."

Performer/Composer Amy Knoles recently created a 4.0 solo live electronic version of Crazy Nigger. She toured the Pacific Northwest and Europe in the Fall of 2013, with a program called Julius Eastman FOUND. She performed on the MalletKat with an elaborate system of loops, developed in Ableton LIVE with the Keith McMillen 12Step foot controller.

Lutosławski Piano Duo (Emilia Sitarz and Bartek Wąsik) have been performing his compositions regularly since 2014. Their repertoire contains "Evil Nigger" and "Gay Guerilla" (with Joanna Duda and Mischa Kozłowski). The premiere of their version of "Crazy Nigger" took place in December 2017 during KWADROFONIK FESTIVAL in Warsaw.

In October 2015, Bowerbird, a Philadelphia-based non-profit presented Eastman's "Crazy Nigger" as the first event in a multi-year survey of the composer's work.

A biography of Eastman, Gay Guerrilla: Julius Eastman and His Music, edited by Renée Levine Packer and Mary Jane Leach was released in December 2015 on Eastman Studies in Music.

A larger Eastman retrospective took place at the London Contemporary Music Festival in December 2016, and included the presentation of seven Eastman works, several pieces closely associated with Eastman and an exhibition, spread over three nights.

On January 24, 2017, an evening of Eastman's works were presented as "A portrait of Julius Eastman" at the long-running modern classical music series, Monday Evening Concerts, in Los Angeles. The program consisted of "Prelude to the Holy Presence of Joan d'Arc" for solo baritone singer, "The Holy Presence of Joan d'Arc" for ten cellos and "Crazy Nigger" for four pianos. The concert was very well received by a nearly sold-out audience in the Zipper Concert Hall at the Colburn School for the Performing Arts.

The 2017 MaerzMusik festival opened with three of Julius Eastman's works for four pianos on March 17. Furthermore, from 17th to 26 March, the space of SAVVY Contemporary became a documentation center dedicated to the oeuvre of Julius Eastman.

In May 2017, after more than three years of research, Bowerbird presented "That Which Is Fundamental" - a four-concert retrospective and month-long exhibition of Eastman's work.  Included in the festival were the modern premieres of several of Eastman's early works, including "Macle" and "Thruway".  This project was the first retrospective produced in collaboration with the Eastman Estate.

In September 2017, contemporary music festival Sacrum Profanum in Krakow, presented four concerts with nine Julius Eastman's compositions in total. Extensive research of the curator Krzysztof Pietraszewski, assisted by Mary Jane Leach, Petr Kotik and Michał Mendyk resulted in wide and diverse composer's picture - Eastman was one of two main figures of 2017 edition of the festival (among Moondog). Petr Kotik with S.E.M. Ensemble prepared interpretations of "Joy Boy", "Our Father", "Piano 2" and "Macle", Anton Lukoszevieze and Apartment House performed "Buddha", "Stay On It" and "Hail Mary" and Arditti Quartet performed a three string quartets version (commissioned from Tomasz Jakub Opałka by Sacrum Profanum festival) of "Evil Nigger". New version of this famous piece was a world premiere, above that "Our Father" and "Joy Boy" were restored for the first time.

In February 2018 Luciano Chessa completed his edition of the
Symphony No. II. The Faithful Friend, The Lover Friend's Love for the
Beloved, Eastman's only work for large orchestra. On November 20 Chessa
conducted the orchestra of the Mannes School of Music in the premiere of Eastman II at Lincoln
Center's Alice Tully Hall in NYC to a considerable acclaim. The preview
piece in The New York Times featured clips from the rehearsal of the
piece, and a review followed 

In March 2018, SAVVY Contemporary Berlin in collaboration with MaerzMusik Festival continued their interdisciplinary project on Julius Eastman with a series of German premieres of his pieces as well as world-premieres of newly commissioned pieces – in a series of concerts, an exhibition and a symposium with Mary Jane Leach, George E. Lewis, Christine Rusiniak, Kodwo Eshun, Rocco Di Pietro, and many others. In 2020, SAVVY Contemporary published a collection of essays, librettos, lyrics, memories, photos, personal anecdotes called We Have Delivered Ourselves from the Tonal — Of, Towards, On, For Julius Eastman with contributors like George E. Lewis, Kodwo Eshun, Mary Jane Leach, and many others.

In 2018 visual artist Tiona Nekkia McClodden curated an exhibition based on her research around Eastman at New York's The Kitchen. It included performances of his work and work of contemporary artists inspired by Eastman including Carolyn Lazard, Sondra Perry, and Chloe Bass and others.

In 2018 visual artist Michael Anthony Garcia and composer Russell Reed performed  with the Austin Chamber Music Festival.

In 2018 publisher G. Schirmer announced it would restore, reconstruct, publish and promote his music, in collaboration with his estate managed by Julius's brother Gerry Eastman.

In October 2019, Sacrum Profanum festival in Krakow presented "Holy Presence of Joan D'Arc" with "Prelude" and premiered another commissioned version of "Evil Nigger", this time arranged by Piotr Peszat for four accordions, performed by Rafał Łuc and Maciej Frąckiewicz.

In February 2020, the American piano sextet Grand Band, performed "Gay Guerilla" in the Peak Debut Series at Montclair State University, featuring six grand pianos played by Erika Dohi, David Friend, Paul Kerekes, Blair McMillen, Lisa Moore and Isabelle O'Connell.

In October 2021 Eastman was the subject of BBC Radio 3's Composer of the Week.

Eastman's piece Crazy Nigger was featured in three performances in late 2021 and early 2022 presented by the Rudolfinum Gallery and the Czech Philharmonic in Prague, Czech Republic.

The Ojai Music Festival, running from June 9 to June 12, 2022, in Ojai California, will feature several works by Eastman.

British electronic musician Loraine James released an album inspired by Eastman's work on October 7, 2022.

On December 2, 2022, Helsinki-based record label Frozen Reeds announced the first ever vinyl run for a 1974 recording of Femenine by the S.E.M. Ensemble with Eastman on piano, due for release May 30, 2023. The recording was remastered from the original high-definition tape transfer by Jim O'Rourke at his Steamroom studio in Japan. The release features republished liner notes written by Eastman and Mary Jane Leach.

Known works

Piano Pieces I - IV (1968) for solo piano
Thruway (1970) for flute, clarinet, trombone, violin, cello, soprano solo, off stage jazz trio, SATB choir, electronics 
The Moon's Silent Modulation (1970) for dancers, vocalists and chamber ensemble
Touch Him When (1970) for piano 4 hands
Trumpet (1970) for 7 trumpets
Macle (1971) for voices and electronics
Comp 1 (1971) for solo flute
Mumbaphilia (1972) for solo performer and dancers
Wood in Time (1972) for 8 metronomes
Tripod (1972) instrumentation unknown, score fragment for one treble voice and one tape part exists
Colors (1973) for 14 women's voices and tape
Stay on It (1973) for no fixed instrumentation, although piano, percussion, and voice were always included
440 (1973) for voice, violin, viola and double bass
That Boy (1974) for small instrumental ensemble
Joy Boy (1974) for 4 treble instruments
 (1974) for chamber ensemble
Masculine (1974) for small instrumental ensemble
If You're So Smart, Why Aren't You Rich? (1977) for violin, 2 French horns, 4 trumpets, 2 trombones, tuba, piano, 2 chimes and 2 basses
Nigger Faggot (1978) for bell, percussion, and strings
Dirty Nigger (1978) for 2 flutes, 2 saxophones, bassoon, 3 violins, and 2 double basses
Evil Nigger (1979) for any number of similar instruments, most commonly 4 pianos
Gay Guerilla (ca. 1980) for any number of similar instruments, most commonly 4 pianos
Crazy Nigger (ca. 1980) for any number of similar instruments, most commonly 4 pianos
The Holy Presence of Joan d'Arc (1981) for ten cellos
Untitled [Prelude to The Holy Presence of Joan d'Arc] (1981) for solo voice
Symphony No. II - The Faithful Friend: The Lover Friend's Love for the Beloved (1983) for orchestra
His Most Qualityless Majesty (1983) for piano and voice
Hail Mary (1984) for voice and piano
Buddha (1983) for unspecified instrumentation
Piano 2 (1986) for solo piano
Our Father (1989) for 2 male voices

Recordings

2022 - Julius Eastman Vol. 2: Joy Boy performed by Wild Up (New Amsterdam Records)
2021 - Julius Eastman - Three Extended Pieces for Four Pianos performed by Melaine Dalibert, Stéphane Ginsburgh, Nicolas Horvath and Wilhem Latchoumia (Sub Rosa)
2021 - Julius Eastman Vol. 1:  performed by Wild Up (New Amsterdam Records)
2021 - "Stay On It” performed by Sō Percussion (Eric Cha-Beach, Josh Quillen, Adam Sliwinski, Jason Treuting), MEDIAQUEER (Darian Thomas, Phong Than), Adam Tendler, Shelley Washington, Alex Sopp, Beth Meyers, Grey Mcmurray
2020 -  performed by ensemble 0 and Aum Grand Ensemble (Sub Rosa)
2020 - Touch Him When performed by HOCKET
2019 -  performed by Apartment House (Another Timbre)
2018 - Piano Interpretations performed by Kukuruz Quartet (Intakt Records)
2017 - Stay on It performed by Abdu Ali and Horse Lords
2016 -  performed by the SEM Ensemble (Frozen Reeds)
2014 - "Unchained" performed by Lutosławski Piano Duo and Friends - (pieces by Julius Eastman and Tomasz Sikorski) Bołt Records
2014 - Piano 2 performed by Joseph Kubera on Book of Horizons (New World 80745)
2005 - Unjust Malaise, by various artists (New World 80638) (Includes Stay On It; If You're So Smart, Why Aren't You Rich; Prelude to The Holy Presence of Joan d'Arc; The Holy Presence of Joan d'Arc; Gay Guerrilla; Evil Nigger; Crazy Nigger; and Spoken Introduction to Northwestern University Concert)
1987 - Davies, Peter Maxwell. Miss Donnithorne's Maggot; Eight Songs for a Mad King. London: Unicorn-Kanchana. (Includes Julius Eastman, baritone.)
1983 - Monk, Meredith. Turtle Dreams (Includes Julius Eastman, organ.)
1982 - Dinosaur L. 24→24 Music (Includes Julius Eastman, keyboards and voice.)
1981 - Monk, Meredith.  Dolmen Music.  (Includes Julius Eastman, percussion and voice.)
1972 - Kolb, Barbara, and Richard Moryl. New York: Desto. (Includes Julius Eastman, narrator, on Side A.)

Further reading

Hisama, Ellie M. (2015). “Diving into the earth”: The musical worlds of Julius Eastman. In O. Bloechl, M. Lowe, & J. Kallberg (Eds.), Rethinking Difference in Music Scholarship (pp. 260–286). Cambridge: Cambridge University Press. 

Antonia Alampi, Bonaventure Soh Bejeng Ndikung, Federica Bueti. 2020. We Have Delivered Ourselves from the Tonal — Of, Towards, On, For Julius Eastman (SAVVY Books), Berlin/Milan: Archive Books, ISBN 978-3-948212-11-7.

References

External links
 The Julius Eastman Project
 Julius Eastman That Which Is Fundamental
 Interview and solo vocal performance by Julius Eastman from 1984
 Julius Eastman: "Touch Him When" (9:20) A piano four hands composition played by the composer and Steve Marrow published in 1984 on Tellus Audio Cassette Magazine
 An episode of the BBC's Composer of the Week programme about Julius Eastman's life and work, with baritone Davone Tines, a performer and champion of Eastman’s music

1940 births
1990 deaths
20th-century African-American male singers
20th-century African-American musicians
20th-century American composers
20th-century American pianists
20th-century classical composers
20th-century classical pianists
20th-century American LGBT people
African-American classical composers
American classical composers
African-American classical pianists
African-American male classical composers
American male classical composers
American male classical pianists
American classical pianists
Classical musicians from New York (state)
Curtis Institute of Music alumni
Intakt Records artists
Ithaca College alumni
LGBT African Americans
LGBT classical composers
American LGBT musicians
LGBT people from New York (state)
Musicians from Ithaca, New York
Pupils of Lukas Foss
Singers from New York (state)
University at Buffalo alumni